Khurd may refer to :

 Khurd an administrative placename description used in North India and Pakistan
 Berote Khurd, a subdivision of Berote Kalan Union Council
 Hurd, a Mongolian heavy metal band